Ericeia hirsutitarsus is a moth in the family Erebidae. It is found on Norfolk Island, New Caledonia, Vanuatu, the New Hebrides and the Loyalty Islands.

Subspecies
Ericeia hirsutitarsis hirsutitarsis
Ericeia hirsutitarsis robinsoni Holloway, 1977 (Vanuatu, New Hebrides)

References

Moths described in 1977
Ericeia